Eugene Glazer may refer to:
 Eugene Glazer (fencer), American fencer
 Eugene Robert Glazer, American actor